Sandra Catrin Näslund (born 6 July 1996) is a Swedish freestyle skier, specializing in ski cross and alpine skiing. She is the 2022 ski cross Olympic champion, the 2017, 2021 and 2023 ski cross World Champion, winner of the 2018, 2020, 2022, and 2023 ski cross World Cups, and the overall winner of the 2018 FIS Freestyle Ski World Cup.

Career
Näslund made her Freestyle World Cup debut in March 2012. As of the 2021–22 season, she has won the Ski cross World Cup three times and has won a total of 28 individual World Cup races.

Näslund competed at the 2014 Winter Olympics for Sweden. She finished 10th in the seeding run for the ski cross event. In the first round, she won in her heat, advancing. In the quarterfinals, she finished second, again advancing. She failed to finish her semi-final, ending up in the B final, which she won, to secure 5th place.

She became Sweden's first world champion in ski cross when she won the FIS Freestyle Ski and Snowboarding World Championships 2017 in Sierra Nevada.

During the 2017–2018 season, she won both the skicross and the freestyle skiing world cups for women.

Näslund injured her right knee during practice, in November 2020, before the World Cup season premiere in Arosa. She spent the following eleven weeks rehabilitating her injury, before making her season debut at the World Championships in Idre. Näslund placed second in the qualification run and three days later she won each of the elimination heats, including the big final, to claim her second World Championships gold medal.

Näslund won a gold medal at the 2022 Winter Olympics, where she won the qualification run and each of the following elimination heats, including the big final, becoming the first Swedish skier to win the Ski cross event. Näslund also dominated the Ski cross World Cup over the 2021–22 season, winning eleven out of twelve races.

Personal life 
Näslund is openly lesbian.

World Cup results

Season titles
5 titles (1 overall, 4 ski cross)

Season standings

Ski cross individual victories
 37 wins
 63 podiums

Ski cross mixed team victories
 1 win
 2 podiums

World Championship results

Olympic results

References

External links

1996 births
Living people
Olympic freestyle skiers of Sweden
Freestyle skiers at the 2014 Winter Olympics
Freestyle skiers at the 2018 Winter Olympics
Freestyle skiers at the 2022 Winter Olympics
Swedish female alpine skiers
Swedish female freestyle skiers
People from Kramfors Municipality
Swedish LGBT sportspeople
LGBT skiers
Lesbian sportswomen
Olympic medalists in freestyle skiing
Olympic gold medalists for Sweden
Medalists at the 2022 Winter Olympics
Sportspeople from Västernorrland County
21st-century LGBT people
21st-century Swedish women